Anaphe etiennei is a moth of the family Notodontidae. It was described by Henri Schouteden in 1912. It is found in Cameroon, the Democratic Republic of the Congo and Ivory Coast.

References

Notodontidae
Moths described in 1912
Moths of Africa
Taxa named by Henri Schouteden